The Panache River is a tributary of the east bank of the Wetetnagami River flowing into Senneterre in the La Vallée-de-l'Or Regional County Municipality, in the administrative region of Abitibi-Témiscamingue, in Quebec, in Canada.

This river crosses downstream through the townships of Urban, Carpiquet, Muy and Effiat, successively.

Forestry is the main economic activity of the sector. The second is recreational tourism.

The valley of the Panache River is served by the forest road R1051 (East-West direction) to the North and the forest road R1053 to the South. These two roads also serve the Wetetnagami Lake Biodiversity Reserve which covers the Wetetnagami River Valley.

The surface of the Panache River is usually frozen from early November to mid-May, however safe ice circulation is generally from mid-November to mid-April.

Geography

Toponymy 
At different times in history, this territory has been occupied by the Atikamekw, Algonquins and Cree. The term "plume" generally refers to the plume (especially that of males) of large deer that are part of the family of ruminant mammals.

The name "Rivière au Panache" was officialized on December 5, 1968, at the Commission de toponymie du Québec, when it was created.

See also

References

External links 

Rivers of Abitibi-Témiscamingue
Nottaway River drainage basin